The octagonal Chapel of St Mary at Smith Gate is a former chapel in Oxford, England, now part of Hertford College. It is located on Catte Street, opposite the Clarendon Building.

History
The first chapel of St Mary at Smith Gate already existed in the late 14th century, originally known as the Chapel of Our Lady at Smith Gate. It was just north of the Oxford city wall, but was part of the defences of the Smith Gate, at the junction of Catte Street and New College Lane. Students prayed at the chapel before their disputations at the Divinity School. In 1366, it was described as the little tower of Smith Gate with the statue of the Virgin on it.

In 1520, the chapel was rebuilt, reputedly by William de Hyberdine of Canterbury College. It became unused in 1537 and was thus deconsecrated, with statues and a reredos moved to St Peter-in-the-East. In 1575, Queen Elizabeth I granted the building to John Herbert and Andrew Palmer. However, this did not take effect and in 1583, the city leased the building to Henry Toldervey as a house, with the land behind it.

The building was also known as St Catherine's Chapel, due to the figure over the entrance. However, in March 1844, Mr Rooke of Oriel College informed the Oxford Architectural Society that the figure was actually St Mary. In 1898, the city exchanged the building with George Fisher for a house in St Aldate's. During 1894–1923, the building was used as a shop, including by the Holywell Press. It was designated as 29 Broad Street. In 1923, the building became part of Hertford College. It has been restored by the college and integrated into its New Quad, connected to the older part of the college by the Bridge of Sighs.

In 1954, the building was Grade II listed.

The building now serves as the Middle Common Room (MCR) for graduates at Hertford College in the New Quad, with a kitchen below.

See also
 University Church of St Mary the Virgin, at the southern end of Catte Street

References

External links
 

1520 establishments in England
1537 disestablishments in England
Churches completed in 1520
Chapels of the University of Oxford
Former churches in Oxford
Grade II listed buildings in Oxford
Octagonal churches in the United Kingdom
History of Oxford
Hertford College, Oxford